Morton Hospital is a medical complex located on 88 Washington Street near Route 140 and Route 138 in Taunton, Massachusetts, USA. The facility serves the Greater Taunton Area and is equipped with its own heliport for medical emergency flights. Also, it owns a small rehabilitation facility down the street at Mill River Plaza.

History 
The Taunton Hospital Company was incorporated June 8, 1888.  In 1914, the name of the corporation was changed to Morton Hospital.  It originally occupied the former home of the late Massachusetts Governor Marcus Morton.  In the 20th century, the hospital administered its own nursing school.

Heliport 
The Morton Hospital Heliport  is a heliport composed of one helipad on the roof of Morton Hospital.  The heliport is privately owned and is primarily used at the utmost discretion of the hospital for medical emergency airlifts and transport.  Most often, critically injured patients are airlifted from the hospital to large and well-equipped medical facilities around the region; sometimes as far as Massachusetts General Hospital in Boston.

The heliport is made of asphalt and its dimensions are 40 x 40 ft / 12.2 x 12.2 m.

See also 
Greater Taunton Area
Taunton, Massachusetts

External links
Morton Hospital

References

Hospitals in Bristol County, Massachusetts
Buildings and structures in Taunton, Massachusetts
Heliports in the United States
Hospitals established in 1889